Southern Pacific Railroad's (SP) number 6051 is an EMD E9 diesel locomotive. It was one of nine E9s built for SP by EMD in December 1954 as Construction Number 20100 on SP Order Number P-1041 and EMD Order Number 2068. It entered service on January 4, 1955 at Los Angeles. These nine locomotives allowed the dieselization of the Coast Daylight and Lark passenger trains. The units operated with E7s, ALCO PAs, and other passenger equipped diesels as required. Assigned to the Los Angeles passenger pool for its entire career, it worked north via the Coast Line to San Francisco or east on the Sunset Route to El Paso or New Orleans.  When SP and Rock Island began pooling locomotives on the Chicago-Los Angeles Golden State in 1967, it also worked those trains until they were discontinued the following year, often in mixed SP/Rock Island consists. SP 6051 is the only surviving Southern Pacific passenger-dedicated diesel locomotive, and it currently resides at the California State Railroad Museum in Sacramento, California. It is also used for train excursions.

6051 was delivered in the Daylight paint scheme, with Farr-Aire intake grilles, a Pyle National Gyralight in the upper headlight housing, nose MU connections, dynamic braking, Nathan model M5R24 air horn (it currently sports a Nathan P5), a single Model 4740 steam generator producing . of steam per hour, a  fuel tank, a  boiler water tank, automatic transition, and a freight pilot. In May 1958, SP 6051 was painted in the experimental black with orange nose "halloween" paint scheme. It received the gray and scarlet "bloody nose" paint scheme shortly afterward, likely in 1959. SP 6051 was retired on December 24, 1969 and was donated to the Railway & Locomotive Historical Society at the end of the year along with Baldwin DRS-6-6-1500 5208 and EMD F7A 6402, largely through the efforts of SP Vice President Larry Hoyt. All three units were in turn deeded to the California State Railroad Museum on June 22, 1978 and placed on display near the Sacramento train station or stored at SP's Sacramento General Shops until the California State Railroad Museum was built. SP 6051 was cosmetically and mechanically restored in the early 1980s and is in its original 1955 appearance in the Daylight paint scheme. SP 6051 was also part of the 1981 "Railfair" festivities to celebrate the opening of the California State Railroad Museum.

Southern Pacific 6051 is occasionally used as an ambassador outside of the museum for special occasions in California. Its first trip was when it operated under its own power for display in San Francisco in April 1985. Over the Daylight Saving Time change weekend later that month, it operated on the "Western Rail Day" special trains for SP employees that made a round trip between San Jose and Sacramento on both Saturday and Sunday (the 6051 was returned to the museum during the eastbound trip that Sunday). Other highlights include SP 6051 leading an Operation Lifesaver excursion train in 1987, attending the Los Angeles Union Passenger Terminal's 50th anniversary celebration in 1989, and in  September 2005, SP 6051 and Amtrak 281, an EMD F40PH that is also preserved at the CSRM, made a trip from Sacramento to San Francisco, where it picked up Southern Pacific 2467, a 4-6-2 steam locomotive at the Golden Gate Railroad Museum, and brought it to Sacramento for display at the CSRM.

SP 6051 has made two appearances in the recent past at special events at the Union Pacific's ex-SP yard in Roseville, California. In August 2006 it attended the unveiling of Union Pacific's Southern Pacific Heritage Unit, UP 1996. In April, 2009 it participated in a display along with Union Pacific 844 and various other pieces of equipment for Roseville's centennial celebration.

As of 2011, it is on display inside CSRM's gallery of historic equipment in operational condition. The only other surviving Daylight engine is Southern Pacific 4449, one of the steam locomotives originally displaced by diesels like SP 6051.

References

6051
Electro-Motive Division locomotives
Railway locomotives introduced in 1954
Preserved diesel locomotives
Diesel-electric locomotives of the United States
Standard gauge locomotives of the United States